Symphony No. 18 in F major, K. 130, was the last of three symphonies composed by Wolfgang Amadeus Mozart in May, 1772, when he was sixteen years old.

Structure
The symphony has the scoring of two flutes, four horns, and strings. There are no oboes in this symphony, they were replaced by flutes for the first time. Mozart also used a second pair of horns throughout this work, which is a rarity in his oeuvre.

There are four movements:

Allegro, 
Andantino grazioso, 
Menuetto — Trio, 
Allegro molto,

References

External links

18
1772 compositions
Compositions in F major